The 1987–88 New Jersey Devils season was the 14th season for the National Hockey League franchise that was established on June 11, 1974, and sixth season since the franchise relocated from Colorado prior to the 1982–83 NHL season. The Devils finished fourth in the Patrick Division with a record of 38 wins, 36 losses, and 6 ties for 82 points, garnering the first winning record in the franchise's 14-year history.

On the final day of the regular season, the Devils were tied with their nemesis, the New York Rangers, for the final playoff spot in the Patrick Division. After New York defeated the Quebec Nordiques 3–0, all eyes were on the Devils, who were playing the Blackhawks in Chicago. The Devils trailed 3–2 midway through the third period, but John MacLean scored to tie the game, and with two minutes left in overtime, he added the winning goal. Although the Rangers and Devils both finished with 82 points, the Devils had two more wins, sending them to the playoffs for the second time in franchise history, but the first time in New Jersey.

The Devils rode the momentum of this victory into a surprisingly deep playoff run, ousting the New York Islanders in six games in the Division Semi-finals and  the Washington Capitals in seven games in the Division Finals. They then met the Boston Bruins in the Wales Conference Finals and stretched the series to seven games, but finally fell short in the seventh game (see below).

Offseason
Hoping to light a spark under the team, team owner John McMullen hired Providence College coach and athletic director Lou Lamoriello as team president in April 1987.  Lamoriello appointed himself general manager shortly before the 1987–88 season.  This move came as a considerable surprise to NHL circles; although Lamoriello had been a college coach for 19 years, he had never played, coached, or managed in the NHL and was almost unknown outside the American college hockey community.

Regular season

On November 25, 1987, Aaron Broten scored just 13 seconds into overtime to give the Devils an 8-7 road win over the Edmonton Oilers. It would prove to be the fastest overtime goal scored during the 1987–88 NHL regular season.

On the last day of the season, Sunday, April 3, 1988, the Devils were scheduled to play the Chicago Blackhawks at Chicago Stadium, the Rangers were scheduled to host Quebec Nordiques at home, and the Penguins were scheduled to host Hartford Whalers at home. Going into the game, the Devils were tied with the New York Rangers with 80 points and one point ahead of the Pittsburgh Penguins (79) for the last playoff spot in the Patrick Division. The Penguins beat the Whalers, 4–2, to finish their season with 81 points, and the Rangers shut out the Nordiques, 3–0, to finish their season with 82 points, eliminating the Penguins. When both games ended, the Devils-Blackhawks game was still in progress. Both teams skated to a 3–3 tie after 60 minutes. For the Devils to qualify for the playoffs, they would have to score in overtime to get the win and the two points to win the tiebreaker over the Rangers. An overtime loss would keep them at 80 points, and a 3–3 tie would move them up only to 81 points, handing the last playoff berth to the Rangers. At 2:21 of the overtime period, John MacLean scored the game-winning goal on a rebound slap-shot past Blackhawks netminder Darren Pang to give the Devils a 4–3 win. Both the Devils and Rangers finished with 82 points. However, since the Devils had two more wins during the regular season, they ended up taking the Patrick Division's 4th playoff spot and thereby sealed the first ever playoff berth for the franchise in New Jersey.

Gary Thorne called MacLean's overtime, playoff-berth-clinching goal on SportsChannel New York:

Season standings

Sean Burke
Sean Burke was drafted by the New Jersey Devils in the second round of the 1985 NHL Entry Draft. He earned national attention from his international play. He backstopped Canada's junior team to a silver medal in the 1986 World Junior Championships and a fourth-place finish for the national men's team at the 1988 Calgary Olympics.

Burke went from the Olympics to the Devils. He started 11 games for the Devils in the 1987–88 NHL season, including an overtime victory against the Chicago Blackhawks on the final night of the season that qualified the Devils for their first playoff series.

Dubbed a "rookie sensation", Burke helped the Devils go on a playoff roll, defeating the division-leader New York Islanders in the first round in six games and then the Washington Capitals in seven games. Burke was one game away from the Stanley Cup Finals but lost in Game 7 of the Wales Conference finals to the Boston Bruins.

Schedule and results

Playoffs
The team made it all the way to the conference finals, but lost to the Boston Bruins in seven games. In that series, after a horrendous Game 3 loss to Boston, head coach Jim Schoenfeld verbally abused referee Don Koharski, screaming obscenities and hollering, "Have another doughnut, you fat pig!" The incident resulted in a suspension for Schoenfeld, which the franchise appealed to the New Jersey Superior Court. This unprecedented appeal to authority outside the NHL gave the Devils a preliminary stay of the coach's suspension. In protest, referee Dave Newell and the assigned linesmen boycotted the next game. After more than an hour's delay, amateur officials were tracked down in the stands and worked the game wearing yellow practice sweaters. To resolve the incident, the NHL suspended Schoenfeld for Game 5. Schoenfeld later admitted he regretted his comments.

Patrick Division semi-finals vs. New York Islanders

New Jersey wins series 4-2

Patrick Division finals vs. Washington Capitals

New Jersey wins series 4–3.

Prince of Wales Conference Finals vs. Boston Bruins

New Jersey loses series 3–4.

Player statistics

Forwards
Note: GP = Games played; G = Goals; A = Assists; Pts = Points; PIM = Penalties in minutes

Defensemen
Note: GP = Games played; G = Goals; A = Assists; Pts = Points; PIM = Penalties in minutes

Goaltending
Note: GP = Games played; W = Wins; L = Losses; T = Ties; SO = Shutouts; GAA = Goals against average

Draft picks

Notes

References
Devils on Hockey Database

New Jersey Devils seasons
New Jersey Devils
New Jersey Devils
New Jersey Devils
New Jersey Devils
20th century in East Rutherford, New Jersey
Meadowlands Sports Complex